Manfred Berliner (born 1853 in Hannover; died 1931) was a German business teacher.

Life
He was the fifth child of textile merchant Samuel Berliner and brother of Emil Berliner (inventor of the gramophone), Joseph Berliner, and Jacob Berliner.

After a merchant apprenticeship, military service in the Franco-Prussian war, and work in bookkeeping, he initially managed membership of the Commercial Association. He then became a business teacher and in 1878 founded his "Business Teaching Institute" (Handels-Lehr-Institut) in Hannover, which later became "Berliner's Advanced Business School." The school taught mathematics, bookkeeping, trade and exchange, correspondence, and stenography. In 1903, the school was officially accredited as a vocational school.

He was also involved in the management of a Jewish school in Ahlem, founded by Hannover Banker Alexander Moritz Simon (died 1905).

With his wife Hanna (née Dessau), he had five children including Siegfried (b. 1884), Cora (who was murdered in the Holocaust), and Bernhard, an analyst at the Berlin Psychoanalytic Institute who later immigrated to the USA. Siegfried took over direction of Berliner's school in 1913, but was appointed a professor of business administration at the Imperial University of Tokyo.

Manfred Berliner died in 1931 and is buried at the Jewish Cemetery "An der Strangriede" in Hannover. In his lifetime he came to own 80 properties in Germany which are still held in trust to benefit his heirs. The properties were subject to extensive litigation following the Nazi regime.

Publications
 with Louis Rothschild and Heinrich Gebauer, "L. Rothschild's Pocketbook Merchants." 1893
 The Trade University: A contribution to its assessment. 1899.
 Commercial Accounting in the draft of the New Commercial Code: a critique and counter proposals 1896.
 Difficult cases and general principles of Commercial Accounting. 1902
 Arithmetic book for trade schools and business trading schools. 1905
 Accounting and Accounting theory, 1911.
 Determining the valuation of businesses enterprises for their sale and exchange, 1913.
 Two Months in Big Business: The reality of business dealings as the basis for teaching accounting and business correspondence, 1915.
 50 principles for the theory of commercial accounting, 1915
 Practice of Accountancy, 1919
 The valuation of assets for the balance sheet: a practical guide for businesspeople, lawyers, and tax officials, 1920.

1853 births
1931 deaths
19th-century German Jews
German business theorists